Ronan Biger (born 8 October 1985) is a French football midfielder currently playing for Championnat de France amateur side Vitré.

Honours
Chamois Niortais
 Championnat National champions: 2005–06

References

External links
 

1985 births
Living people
Footballers from Paris
French footballers
Association football midfielders
Chamois Niortais F.C. players
AS Moulins players
Les Herbiers VF players
Andrézieux-Bouthéon FC players
AS Vitré players
Ligue 2 players
Championnat National players
Brittany international footballers